Myron Holley Clark (October 23, 1806 – August 23, 1892) was an American politician from the U.S. state of New York.

Early life
Clark was born in Naples, Ontario County, New York on October 23, 1806. He was the eldest son of Maj. Joseph Clark (1782–1840) and Mary ( Sutton) Clark (1782–1865). His grandfather, Col. William Clark, had migrated to Ontario County from Berkshire County, Massachusetts, in 1790 after the American Revolution.

His education was limited and was in the common schools of New York.

Career

He served in the state's militia as a lieutenant colonel and then entered politics, first serving as President of the then-village of Canandaigua, New York, and eventually becoming Sheriff of Ontario County, New York.

He was a member of the New York State Senate (29th D.) from 1852 to 1854, sitting in the 75th, 76th and 77th New York State Legislatures. At the New York state election, 1854, he was nominated as the Whig candidate, and was elected Governor of New York in the closest gubernatorial election in New York State history. He served as Governor from January 1, 1855 to December 31, 1856.

As Governor, Clark was noted for his meddling with militia appointments, causing the resignation of the state Adjutant General John Watts de Peyster. In 1862, President Abraham Lincoln appointed Clark the first Collector of Internal Revenue of in the Ontario County district.

Clark made several attempts to effect prohibition in the state and signed a prohibition law while governor, but the law was declared unconstitutional by the New York Court of Appeals. His steadfast advocating of temperance led to his nomination on the Prohibition ticket to run again for Governor at the New York state election, 1874. He finished in third place, behind Democrat Samuel J. Tilden and the incumbent Republican Governor John Adams Dix.

Personal life
In 1830 Clark was married to Zilpha Watkins (1806–1877), a daughter of Andrew Watkins and Abigail ( Stanley) Watkins. Together, they were the parents of five children, one son and four daughters, including:

 Lorenzo Elijah Clark (1833–1917), a banker who married Elizabeth Sheley, a daughter of Alanson Sheley.
 Zilpha Clark (1834–1915), who married Samuel D. Backus.
 Mary Lee Clark (1835–1923), who married prominent banker Frederick Ferris Thompson.
 Charlotte Elizabeth Clark (1838–1929), who died unmarried.
 Abigail Stanley Clark (1843–1902), who married banker George Norton Williams, in 1866.

Clark died in Canandaigua, New York on August 23, 1892.  He is interred at Woodlawn Cemetery in Canandaigua.

Legacy
As a memorial to Clark, his daughter Mary  presented a scenic and geologically significant tract of land to New York State in 1915 that is now part of Clark Reservation State Park. Comptroller Clark Williams was his grandson.

References

External links
 National Governors Association website
 Myron Holley Clark Papers, 1809-1899; bulk, 1829-1867 at the New York State Library

New York (state) Republicans
1806 births
1892 deaths
Sheriffs of Ontario County, New York
New York (state) Whigs
Governors of New York (state)
New York (state) state senators
People from Naples, New York
Politicians from Canandaigua, New York
New York (state) Prohibitionists
American temperance activists
Whig Party state governors of the United States
19th-century American politicians
Activists from New York (state)